Claudine is a given name of French origin. It is the feminine form of the ancient Roman name Claudius.  In the United States, the name was considered on the verge of extinction by 2013.

People with this name include:

 Claudine Andre (born 1946), Belgian naturalist
 Claudine Auger (1941–2019), French actress
 Claudine Barretto (born 1979), Filipino actress
 Claudine Beccarie (born 1945), French pornographic actress
 Claudine Chomat (1915–1995), French activist
 Claudine Clark (born 1941), American musician
 Claudine de Culam (died 1601), French zoophile
 Claudine Doury (born 1959), French photographer
 Claudine Françoise Mignot (1624–1711), French adventuress
 Claudine Grimaldi (c. 1541–1515), Lady of Monaco
 Claudine Guérin de Tencin (1682–1749), French salonist and author
 Claudine Komgang (born 1974), Cameroonian sprinter
 Claudine Lepage (born 1949), French politician
 Claudine LeRoux (born 1964), French sprint canoer
 Claudine Longet (born 1942), French singer
 Claudine Mendy (born 1990), French handball player
 Claudine Mercier (born 1961), Canadian entertainer
 Claudine Monteil (born 1949), French writer and feminist
 Claudine Munari (born 1954), Congolese politician
 Claudine Muno (born 1979), Luxembourgian author, musician and teacher
 Countess Claudine Rhédey von Kis-Rhéde (1812–1841), Hungarian countess
 Claudine Schaul (born 1983), Luxembourgian tennis player
 Claudine Schneider (born 1947), American politician
 Claudine de la Tour-Turenne (1520–1591), French lady-in-waiting
 Claudine Trécourt (born 1962), French ski mountaineer, guide and teacher

Fictional characters
 Claudine Crane, a character in The Southern Vampire Mysteries novels
 Claudine de Montesse, the protagonist of the 1978 manga series Claudine
 Claudine Saijo, a character in the Revue Starlight franchise

References 

French feminine given names